The Sto-Rox School District is a suburban, public school district in Allegheny County, Pennsylvania. The district encompasses the borough of McKees Rocks along with Stowe Township. According to 2000 federal census data, it serves a resident population of 13,330 people. By 2010, the district's population declined to 12,468 people. In 2009, Sto-Rox School District residents' per capita income was $15,833, while the median family income was $33,343 a year. In the Commonwealth, the median family income was $49,501 and the United States median family income was $49,445, in 2010. By 2013, the median household income in the United States rose to $52,100.

As of 2006, the school districts' official colors changed from Kelly green and white to hunter green and white. The official mascot is the viking.

Buildings

All elementary students of the Sto-Rox School District in grades K-3 attend Sto-Rox Primary Center in Kennedy Township. The school was built in 1997 and has an east and west wing. All middle school students in grades 4-6 attend Sto-Rox Upper Elementary in Kennedy Township. The state-of-the-art modern building was constructed in 2002. Both schools have convenient access to a nature trail which is located in the woods behind the buildings.

All secondary students (grades 7-12) attend Sto-Rox High School in Stowe Township. The building was built in 1926 as the Stowe Township High School, but became Sto-Rox High School in the 1967 when Stowe Township School District merged with the School District of the Borough of McKees Rocks, thus forming Sto-Rox.

Extracurriculars
Sto-Rox School District offers a wide variety of clubs, activities and sports.

Sports
The district funds:

Boys
Basketball- AA
Baseball-AA
Football - A

Girls
Basketball - AA
Softball-AA
Volleyball - A

References

External links
 

School districts in Allegheny County, Pennsylvania
Education in Pittsburgh area